Andre Agassi was the defending champion but did not compete that year.

Renzo Furlan won in the final 3–6, 6–3, 7–5 against Michael Chang.

Seeds
A champion seed is indicated in bold text while text in italics indicates the round in which that seed was eliminated.

Draw

External links
1994 San Jose Open Draw

San Jose Open - Singles